Abbasabad-e Holum Sar (also Romanized as ‘Abbāsābād-e Holūm Sar; also known as ‘Abbāsābād) is a village in Gahrbaran-e Jonubi Rural District, Gahrbaran District, Miandorud County, Mazandaran Province, Iran. At the 2006 census, its population was 1,118, in 286 families.

References 

Populated places in Miandorud County